The Serrinha do Alambari Environmental Protection Area is an environmental protection area in the state of Rio de Janeiro, Brazil.

Location

The Serrinha do Alambari Environmental Protection Area (APA) is in the municipality of Resende, Rio de Janeiro, west of the RJ-163 highway.
The APA is on the eastern slope of the Itatiaia National Park in the Mantiqueira Mountains.
It protects the upper reaches of the catchment basins of the Alambari and Pirapitinga rivers.

The APA is in the Agulhas Negras region, known for its mountain scenery and waterfalls of cold, clear water.
The ecosystem is well-preserved.
There is a master plan for the APA, which supports ecotourism, adventure tourism and outdoor sports.
It contains a trout farm, and a mountain camping location.

History

The Serrinha do Alambari Environmental Protection Area was created by Municipal Law 1.726 of 1991. 
The Master Plan for Eco-Development of the APA was approved by law No. 1,845 of 1994.
The APA  is part of the Mantiqueira Mosaic of conservation units, established in 2006.

Notes

Sources

Protected areas of Rio de Janeiro (state)
Environmental protection areas of Brazil
1991 establishments in Brazil